Mikel Gaztañaga Echevarria (born 30 December 1979 in Itsasondo, Spain) is a Spanish former professional road racing cyclist.

Major results 

2003
1st Stage 7 Circuito Montañés
1st Stage 3 Vuelta a Navarra
2005
5th Circuito de Getxo
7th Trofeo Alcudia
2006
1st Circuito de Getxo
1st Tour de Vendée
1st Stage 3 Vuelta Ciclista a la Comunidad de Madrid
2nd La Roue Tourangelle
3rd Tour du Finistère
8th Boucles de l'Aulne
2007
1st Tour de Vendée
1st Stage 1 GP Internacional Paredes Rota dos Móveis
5th GP de la Ville de Rennes
2008
1st Classic Loire-Atlantique
2009
3rd Circuito de Getxo
5th Tro-Bro Léon

External links

Cyclists from the Basque Country (autonomous community)
Spanish male cyclists
1979 births
Living people
People from Goierri
Sportspeople from Gipuzkoa